Zita of Bourbon-Parma (Zita Maria delle Grazie Adelgonda Micaela Raffaela Gabriella Giuseppina Antonia Luisa Agnese; 9 May 1892 – 14 March 1989) was the wife of Charles I, the last monarch of Austria-Hungary. As such, she was the last Empress of Austria and Queen of Hungary, in addition to other titles. She was declared Servant of God by Pope Benedict XVI. 

Born as the seventeenth child of the dispossessed Robert I, Duke of Parma, and his second wife, Infanta Maria Antonia of Portugal, Zita married the then Archduke Charles of Austria in 1911. Charles became heir presumptive to the Emperor Franz Joseph I of Austria in 1914 after the assassination of his uncle Archduke Franz Ferdinand of Austria, and acceded to the throne in 1916 after the elderly emperor's death.

After the end of World War I in 1918, the Habsburgs were deposed and the former empire became home to the states of Austria, Hungary, and Czechoslovakia, while other parts were annexed to or joined the Kingdom of the Serbs, Croats and Slovenes, Italy, Romania, and a reconstituted independent Poland. Charles and Zita left for exile in Switzerland and, after the failure of attempts to restore royal rule in Hungary, were subsequently removed from that country by the Allies to Madeira, where Charles died in 1922. After her husband's death, Zita and her son Otto served as symbols of unity for the exiled dynasty. A devout Catholic, she raised a large family after being widowed at the age of 29; she never remarried.

Early life
Princess Zita of Bourbon-Parma was born at the Villa Pianore in the Italian Province of Lucca, 9 May 1892. The unusual name Zita was given to her after Zita, a popular Italian saint who had lived in Tuscany in the 13th century. She was the third daughter and fifth child of the deposed Robert I, Duke of Parma and his second wife Infanta Maria Antonia of Portugal, a daughter of King Miguel of Portugal and his wife Princess Adelaide of Löwenstein-Wertheim-Rosenberg. Zita's father had lost his throne as a result of the movement for Italian unification in 1859 when he was still a child. He fathered twelve children during his first marriage to Princess Maria Pia of the Two Sicilies (six of whom were mentally disabled, and three of whom died young). Duke Robert became a widower in 1882, and two years later he married Infanta Maria Antonia of Portugal, Zita's mother. The second marriage produced a further twelve children. Zita was the 17th child among Duke Robert's 24 children. Robert moved his large family between Villa Pianore (a large property located between Pietrasanta and Viareggio) and his Schwarzau Castle in lower Austria. It was mainly in these two residences that Zita spent her formative years. The family spent most of the year in Austria, moving to Pianore in the winter and returning in the summer. To move between them, they took a special train with sixteen coaches to accommodate the family and their belongings.

Zita and her siblings were raised to speak Italian, French, German, Spanish, Portuguese and English. She recalled:

At the age of ten, Zita was sent to a boarding school at Zanberg in Upper Bavaria, where there was a strict regime of study and religious instruction. She was summoned home in the autumn of 1907 at the death of her father. Her maternal grandmother sent Zita and her sister Francesca to a convent on the Isle of Wight to complete her education. Brought up as devout Catholics, the Parma children regularly undertook good works for the poor. In Schwarzau the family turned surplus cloth into clothes. Zita and Francesca personally distributed food, clothing, and medicines to the needy in Pianore. Three of Zita's sisters became nuns and, for a time, she considered following the same path. Zita went through a patch of poor health and was sent for the traditional cure at a European spa for two years.

Marriage

In the close vicinity of Schwarzau castle was the Villa Wartholz, residence of Archduchess Maria Theresa of Austria, Zita's maternal aunt. She was the stepmother of Archduke Otto, who died in 1906, and the step-grandmother of Archduke Charles of Austria-Este, at that time second-in-line to the Austrian throne. The two daughters of Archduchess Maria Theresa of Austria were Zita's first cousins and Charles' half-aunts. They had met as children but did not see one another for almost ten years, as each pursued their education. In 1909, his Dragoon regiment was stationed at Brandýs nad Labem, from where he visited his aunt at Františkovy Lázně. It was during one of these visits that Charles and Zita became reacquainted. Charles was under pressure to marry (Franz Ferdinand, his uncle and first-in-line, had married morganatically, and his children were excluded from the throne) and Zita had a suitably royal genealogy. Zita later recalled:

Archduke Charles traveled to Villa Pianore and asked for Zita's hand and, on 13 June 1911, their engagement was announced at the Austrian court. Zita in later years recalled that after her engagement she had expressed to Charles her worries about the fate of the Austrian Empire and the challenges of the monarchy. Charles and Zita were married at the Schwarzau castle on 21 October 1911. Charles's great-uncle, the 81-year-old Emperor Franz Joseph, attended the wedding. He was relieved to see an heir make a suitable marriage, and was in good spirits, even leading the toast at the wedding breakfast. Archduchess Zita soon conceived a son, and Otto was born 20 November 1912. Seven more children followed in the next decade.

Wife of the heir to Austrian throne
At this time, Archduke Charles was in his twenties and did not expect to become emperor for some time, especially while Franz Ferdinand remained in good health. This changed on 28 June 1914 when the heir and his wife Sophie were assassinated in Sarajevo by Bosnian Serb nationalists. Charles and Zita received the news by telegram that day. She said of her husband, "Though it was a beautiful day, I saw his face go white in the sun."

In the war that followed, Charles was promoted to General in the Austrian army, taking command of the 20th Corps for an offensive in Tyrol. The war was personally difficult for Zita, as several of her brothers fought on opposing sides in the conflict (Prince Felix and Prince René had joined the Austrian army, while Prince Sixtus and Prince Xavier lived in France before the war and enlisted in the Belgian army.) Also her country of birth, Italy, joined the war against Austria in 1915, and so rumours of the 'Italian' Zita began to be muttered. Even as late as 1917, The German ambassador in Vienna, Count Botho von Wedel-Jarlsberg would write to Berlin saying "The Empress is descended from an Italian princely house... People do not entirely trust the Italian and her brood of relatives."

At Franz Joseph's request, Zita and her children left their residence at Hetzendorf and moved into a suite of rooms at Schönbrunn Palace. Here, Zita spent many hours with the old Emperor on both formal and informal occasions, where Franz Joseph confided in her his fears for the future. Emperor Franz Joseph died of bronchitis and pneumonia at the age of 86 on 21 November 1916. "I remember the dear plump figure of Prince Lobkowitz going up to my husband," Zita later recounted, "and, with tears in his eyes, making the sign of the cross on Charles's forehead. As he did so he said, 'May God bless Your Majesty.' It was the first time we had heard the Imperial title used to us."

Empress and queen

Charles and Zita were crowned in Budapest on 30 December 1916. Following the coronation there was a banquet, but after that the festivities ended, as the emperor and empress thought it wrong to have prolonged celebrations during a time of war. At the beginning of the reign, Charles was more often than not away from Vienna, so he had a telephone line installed from Baden (where Charles's military headquarters were located) to the Hofburg. He called Zita several times a day whenever they were separated. Zita had some influence on her husband and would discreetly attend audiences with the Prime Minister or military briefings, and she had a special interest in social policy. However, military matters were the sole domain of Charles. Energetic and strong-willed, Zita accompanied her husband to the provinces and to the front, as well as occupying herself with charitable works and hospital visits to the war-wounded.

Sixtus affair
By the spring of 1917, the War was dragging on towards its fourth year, and Zita's brother Sixtus of Bourbon-Parma, a serving officer in the Belgian Army, was a main mover behind a plan for Austria-Hungary to make a separate peace with France. Charles initiated contact with Sixtus through contacts in neutral Switzerland, and Zita wrote a letter inviting him to Vienna. Zita's mother Maria Antonia delivered the letter in person.

Sixtus arrived with conditions for talks which had been agreed with the French – the restoration to France of Alsace-Lorraine (annexed by Germany after the Franco-Prussian War in 1870); restoration of the independence of Belgium; independence for the kingdom of Serbia; and the handover of Constantinople to Russia. Charles agreed, in principle, to the first three points and wrote a letter to Sixtus dated 25 March 1917 which sent "the secret and unofficial message" to the President of France that "I will use all means and all my personal influence". This attempt at dynastic diplomacy eventually foundered. Germany refused to negotiate over Alsace-Lorraine, and, seeing a Russian collapse on the horizon, was loath to give up the war. Sixtus continued his efforts, even meeting Lloyd George in London about Italy's territorial demands on Austria in the Treaty of London of 1915, but the Prime Minister could not persuade his generals that Britain should make peace with Austria. Zita managed a personal achievement during this time by stopping the German plans to send airplanes to bomb the home of the King and Queen of Belgium on their name days.

In April 1918, after the German-Russian Treaty of Brest-Litovsk, Austrian Foreign Minister Count Ottokar Czernin made a speech attacking incoming French Prime Minister Georges Clemenceau as being the main obstacle to a peace favouring the Central Powers. Clemenceau was incensed and, after seeing the Emperor Charles's letter of 24 March 1917, had it published. For a while, the life of Sixtus appeared to be in danger, and there were even fears that Germany might occupy Austria. Czernin persuaded Charles to send a 'Word of Honour' to Austria's allies saying that Sixtus had not been authorised to show the letter to the French Government, that Belgium had not been mentioned, and that Clemenceau had lied about the mentioning of Alsace. Czernin had actually been in contact with the German Embassy throughout the whole crisis and attempted to persuade the Emperor to step down because of the Affair. After failing to do so, Czernin resigned as Foreign Minister.

End of Empire
By this time, the war was closing in on the embattled Emperor. A Union of Czech Deputies had already sworn an oath to a new Czechoslovak state independent of the Habsburg Empire on 13 April 1918, the prestige of the German Army had taken a severe blow at the Battle of Amiens, and, on 25 September 1918, her brother in law King Ferdinand I of Bulgaria broke away from his allies in the Central Powers and sued for peace independently. Zita was with Charles when he received the telegram of Bulgaria's collapse. She remembered it "made it even more urgent to start peace talks with the Western Powers while there was still something to talk about." On 16 October, the emperor issued a "People's Manifesto" proposing the empire be restructured on federal lines with each nationality gaining its own state. Instead, each nation broke away and the empire effectively dissolved.

Leaving behind their children at Gödöllő, Charles and Zita travelled to the Schönbrunn Palace. By this time ministers had been appointed by the new state of "German-Austria", and by 11 November, together with the emperor's spokesmen, they prepared a manifesto for Charles to sign. Zita, at first glance, mistook it for an abdication and made her famous statement:

Charles gave his permission for the document to be published, and he, his family and the remnants of his Court departed for the Royal shooting lodge at Eckartsau, close to the borders with Hungary and Slovakia. The Republic of German-Austria was proclaimed the next day.

Exile

After a difficult few months at Eckartsau, the Imperial Family received aid from an unexpected source. Prince Sixtus had met King George V and appealed to him to help the Habsburgs. George was reportedly moved by the request, it being only months since his imperial relatives in Russia had been executed by revolutionaries, and promised "We will immediately do what is necessary."

Several British Army officers were sent to help Charles, most notably Lieutenant-Colonel Edward Lisle Strutt, who was a grandson of Lord Belper and a former student at the University of Innsbruck. On 19 March 1919, orders were received from the War Office to "get the Emperor out of Austria without delay". With some difficulty, Strutt managed to arrange a train to Switzerland, enabling the Emperor to leave the country with dignity without having to abdicate. Charles, Zita, their children and their household left Eckartsau on 24 March escorted by a detachment of British soldiers from the Honourable Artillery Company under the command of Strutt.

Hungary and exile in Madeira

The family's first home in exile was Wartegg Castle in Rorschach, Switzerland, a property owned by the Bourbon-Parmas. However, the Swiss authorities, worried about the implication of the Habsburgs living near the Austrian border, compelled them to move to the western part of the country. The next month, therefore, found them moving to Villa Prangins, near Lake Geneva, where they resumed a quiet family life. This abruptly ended in March 1920 when, after a period of instability in Hungary, Miklós Horthy was elected regent. Charles was still technically King (as Charles IV) but Horthy sent an emissary to Prangins advising him not to go to Hungary until the situation had calmed. After the Trianon Treaty Horthy's ambition soon grew. Charles became concerned and requested the help of Colonel Strutt to get him into Hungary. Charles twice attempted to regain control, once in March 1921 and again in October 1921. Both attempts failed, despite Zita's staunch support (she insisted on travelling with him on the final dramatic train journey to Budapest).

Charles and Zita temporarily resided at Castle Tata, the home of Count Esterházy, until a suitable permanent exile could be found. Malta was mooted as a possibility, but was declined by Lord Curzon, and French territory was ruled out given the possibility of Zita's brothers intriguing on Charles's behalf. Eventually, the Portuguese island of Madeira was chosen. On 31 October 1921, the former Imperial couple were taken by rail from Tihany to Baja, where the Royal Navy monitor HMS Glowworm was waiting. They finally arrived at Funchal on 19 November. Their children were being looked after at Wartegg Castle in Switzerland by Charles's step-grandmother Maria Theresa, although Zita managed to see them in Zurich when her son Robert needed an operation for appendicitis. The children joined their parents in Madeira in February 1922.

Death of Charles
Charles had been in poor health for some time. After going shopping on a chilly day in Funchal to buy toys for Carl Ludwig, he was struck by an attack of bronchitis. This rapidly worsened into pneumonia, not helped by the inadequate medical care available. Several of the children and staff were also ill, and Zita (at the time eight months pregnant) helped nurse them all. Charles weakened and died on 1 April, his last words to his wife being "I love you so much." Charles was 34 years old. After his funeral, a witness said of Zita "This woman really is to be admired. She did not, for one second, lose her composure... she greeted the people on all sides and then spoke to those who had helped out with the funeral. They were all under her charm." Zita wore mourning black in Charles's memory throughout sixty-seven years of widowhood.

Widowhood

After Charles's death, the former Austrian imperial family were soon to move again. Alfonso XIII of Spain had approached the British Foreign Office via his ambassador in London, and they agreed to allow Zita and her seven (soon to be eight) children to relocate to Spain. Alfonso duly sent the warship Infanta Isabel to Funchal and this took them to Cadiz. They were then escorted to the Pardo Palace in Madrid, where shortly after her arrival Zita gave birth to Archduchess Elisabeth. Alfonso XIII offered his exiled Habsburg relatives the use of Palacio Uribarren at Lekeitio in the Bay of Biscay. This appealed to Zita, who did not want to be a heavy burden to the state that harboured her. For the next six years Zita settled in Lekeitio, where she got on with the job of raising and educating her children. They lived with straitened finances, mainly living on income from private property in Austria, income from a vineyard in Johannisberg in the Rhine Valley, and voluntary collections. Other members of the exiled Habsburg dynasty, however, claimed much of this money, and there were regular petitions for help from former Imperial officials.

Move to Belgium
By 1929, several of the children were approaching the age to attend university and the family sought to move to the Belgian village of Steenokkerzeel near Brussels, where they were closer to several members of their family. Zita continued her political lobbying on behalf of the Habsburg family, even sounding out links with Mussolini's Italy. There was even a possibility of a Habsburg restoration under the Austrian Chancellors Engelbert Dollfuss and Kurt Schuschnigg, with Crown Prince Otto visiting Austria numerous times. These overtures were abruptly ended by the annexation of Austria by Nazi Germany in 1938. As exiles, the Habsburg family took the lead in resisting the Nazis in Austria, but this foundered because of opposition between monarchists and socialists.

Flight to North America
With the Nazi invasion of Belgium on 10 May 1940, Zita and her family became war refugees. They narrowly missed being killed by a direct hit on the castle by German bombers and fled to Prince Xavier's castle at Bostz in France. The Habsburgs then fled to the Spanish border, reaching it on 18 May. On June 12 the Portuguese ruler António Salazar issued instructions to the Portuguese consulates in France to provide Infanta Maria Antónia of Portugal Duchess of Parma with Portuguese Passports. With these Portuguese Passport the entire entourage of her family could get visas without creating problems to the neutrality of the Portuguese Government. This way the daughter of Maria Antónia, Zita of Bourbon-Parma, and her son Otto von Habsburg got their visas because they were descendants of a Portuguese citizen.
They moved on to Portugal and resided in Cascais. Not long after, the archduke was informed by Salazar that Hitler had demanded his extradition. The demand would be refused, the Portuguese ruler told him but hinted that his safety was precarious. On 9 July the U.S. Government granted the family exit visas. After a perilous journey they arrived in New York City on 27 July, having family in Long Island and Newark, New Jersey; at one point, Zita and several of her children lived, as long-term house-guests, in Tuxedo Park, New York.

The Austrian imperial refugees eventually settled in Quebec, which had the advantage of being French-speaking (the younger children were not yet fluent in English). As they were cut off from all European funds, finances were more stretched than ever. At one stage, Zita was reduced to making salad and spinach dishes from dandelion leaves. However, all her sons were active in the war effort. Otto promoted the dynasty's role in a post-war Europe and met regularly with Franklin Roosevelt; Robert was the Habsburg representative in London; Carl Ludwig and Felix joined the United States Army, serving with several American-raised relatives of the Mauerer line; Rudolf smuggled himself into Austria in the final days of the war to help organise the resistance. In 1945 Empress Zita celebrated her birthday on the first day of peace, 9 May. She was to spend the next two years touring the United States and Canada to raise funds for war-ravaged Austria and Hungary.

Post-War

After a period of rest and recovery, Zita found herself regularly going back to Europe for the weddings of her children. She decided to move back to the continent full-time, in 1952, to Luxembourg, in order to look after her aging mother. Maria Antonia died at the age of 96 in 1959. The bishop of Chur proposed to Zita that she move into a residence that he administered (formerly a castle of the Counts de Salis) at Zizers, Graubünden in Switzerland. As the castle had enough space for visits from her large family and a nearby chapel (a necessity for the devoutly Catholic Zita), she accepted with ease.

Zita occupied herself in her final years with her family. Although the restrictions on the Habsburgs entering Austria had been lifted, this only applied to those born after 10 April 1919. This meant Zita could not attend the funeral of her daughter Adelheid in 1972, which was painful for her. She also involved herself in the efforts to have her deceased husband, the "Peace Emperor" canonised. In 1982, the restrictions were eased, and she returned to Austria after having been absent for six decades. Over the next few years, the Empress made several visits to her former Austrian homeland, even appearing on Austrian television. In a series of interviews with the Viennese tabloid newspaper Kronen Zeitung, Zita expressed her belief that the deaths of Crown Prince Rudolf of Austria and his mistress Baroness Mary Vetsera, at Mayerling, in 1889, were not a double suicide, but rather murder by French or Austrian agents.

Death
After a memorable 90th birthday, at which she was surrounded by her now vast family, Zita's habitually robust health began to fail. She developed inoperable cataracts in both eyes. Her last big family gathering took place at Zizers, in 1987, when her children and grandchildren joined in celebrating Empress Zita's 95th birthday. While visiting her daughter, in summer 1988, she developed pneumonia and spent most of the autumn and winter bedridden. Finally, she called Otto, in early March 1989, and told him she was dying. He and the rest of the family travelled to her bedside and took turns keeping her company until she died in the early hours of 14 March 1989. She was 96 years old, and was the last surviving child of Robert, Duke of Parma from both his marriages.

Her funeral was held in Vienna on 1 April. The government allowed it to take place on Austrian soil providing that the cost was borne by the Habsburgs themselves. Zita's body was carried to the Imperial Crypt  under Capuchin Church in the same funeral coach she had walked behind during the funeral of Emperor Franz Joseph in 1916. It was attended by over 200 members of the Habsburg and Bourbon-Parma families, and the service had 6,000 attendees including leading politicians, state officials and international representatives, including a representative of Pope John Paul II. Following an ancient custom, the Empress had asked that her heart, which was placed in an urn, stay behind at Muri Abbey, in Switzerland, where the Emperor's heart had rested for decades. In doing so, Zita assured herself that, in death, she and her husband would remain by each other's side.

When the procession of mourners arrived at the gates of the Imperial Crypt, the herald who knocked on the door during this traditional "admission ceremony" introduced her as  Zita, Her Majesty the Empress and Queen.

Cause of beatification and canonization 

On 10 December 2009, Mgr Yves Le Saux, Bishop of Le Mans, France, opened the diocesan process for the beatification of Zita. Zita was in the habit of spending several months each year in the diocese of Le Mans at St. Cecilia's Abbey, Solesmes, where three of her sisters were nuns.

The actor is the French Association pour la Béatification de l'Impératrice Zita. The postulator for the cause is Alexander Leonhardt.  Vice postulator for Hungary is Catholic theologian Norbert Nagy. The judge of the tribunal is Bruno Bonnet. The promoter of justice is François Scrive.

With the opening of her cause, the late Empress has been named Servant of God.

Honours

 :
 Dame of the Order of the Starry Cross
 Dame Grand Cross of the Imperial Austrian Order of Elizabeth, 1913
 Star of Merit of the Decoration for Services to the Red Cross, with War Decoration
  Sovereign Military Order of Malta: Bailiff Dame Grand Cross, with Distinction for Jerusalem

Children
Charles and Zita had eight children and thirty three grandchildren:

Ancestry

References

Bibliography
 Beeche, Arturo & McIntosh, David. (2005). Empress Zita of Austria, Queen of Hungary (1892–1989) Eurohistory. ASIN: B000F1PHOI
 Bogle, James and Joanna. (1990).  A Heart for Europe: The Lives of Emperor Charles and Empress Zita of Austria-Hungary, Fowler Wright, 1990, 
 Brook-Shepherd, Gordon. (1991). The Last Empress – The Life and Times of Zita of Austria-Hungary 1893–1989. Harper-Collins. 
 Harding, Bertita. (1939). Imperial Twilight: The Story of Karl and Zita of Hungary. Bobbs-Merrill Company Publishers. ASIN: B000J0DDQO
  Bernhard A. Macek: Kaiser Karl I. Der letzte Kaiser Österreichs. Ein biografischer Bilderbogen, Sutton Verlag, Erfurt 2012, 
 (in French) Debris, Cyrille. (2013). Zita, Portrait intime d'une imperatrice. Cerf, Paris, 2013,

External links

Film of Zita of Bourbon-Parma's funeral
 

1892 births
1989 deaths
People from the Province of Lucca
Princesses of Bourbon-Parma
Italian nobility
Italian Roman Catholics
House of Habsburg-Lorraine
Burials at the Imperial Crypt
Austrian empresses
Austrian Roman Catholics
Bohemian queens consort
Hungarian queens consort
Hungarian Roman Catholics
Austrian people of Italian descent
Hungarian people of Italian descent
Dames of Malta
Dames of the Order of Saint Isabel
Austrian Servants of God
Roman Catholic royal saints
Deaths from pneumonia in Switzerland
Daughters of monarchs